Kompayak Porpramook is a Thai professional boxer in the light flyweight and flyweight divisions. He is the former World Boxing Association (WBA) interim flyweight champion and former World Boxing Council (WBC) light flyweight champion. Kompayak Porpramook is considered the second Thai is WBC light flyweight championship from Saman Sorjaturong in the 1990s.

Biography & career
He was born in Buriram province in the northeastern region, but when he was only three years old, he moved to live and grew up in Samut Sakhon province on western outskirts Bangkok, due to his parents who came to work. He started boxing in Muay Thai for 200 baht when he was only 10 and went to Bangkok to fight for the first time in 1997, where he joined Porpramook Boxing Gym.

Porpramook won the WBC light flyweight champion from Adrián Hernández in the thrilling fight at Battalion, 2nd Infantry Regiment, 11th Guards, Bang Khen, with KO in the 10th rounds at the end of 2011 (after the floods in Thailand ended shortly). It was named the WBC's 2011 Fight of the Year.

He later rematch with Hernández in Toluca, Mexico and defeated in the 6th rounds by TKO (referee stops contest), lost the world title.

Porpramook returned to the championship again, with KO over Venezuelan opponent Jean Piero Pérez in the 6th rounds at Khon Kaen City Hall, Khon Kaen, won vacant the WBA flyweight world champion (interim title).  But in the same year (mid 2013), he lost it immediately after 12th rounds in the fight against Koki Eto, a Japanese boxer at Battalion, 2nd Infantry Regiment, 11th Guards, Bang Khen. Kompayak was nearly defeated in the final round with KO and made Eto to become the first Japanese boxer who won the world title in Thailand for many years.

After that he changed the stables and managers several times, including been in the stable of Sombat Banchamek (Buakaw Banchamek). He continues to boxes and also trains Muaythai, boxing, include Karate at Japanese's Zendokai Shingi Dojo in Phra Khanong neighbourhood. On March 24, 2018 he returned to the championship again with 35 years old. He scored the winning (split decision) over Surachart Pisitwuttinan's Pongsaklek Sithdabnij, a rising star fellow countryman at Workpoint Studio, Pathum Thani province. But in the rematch on June 23, 2018 at the same place, he is defeated by the unanimous scores.

Professional boxing record

See also
List of world light-flyweight boxing champions

References

External links

 

1982 births
Living people
Kompayak Porpramook
Kompayak Porpramook
Kompayak Porpramook
Light-flyweight boxers
Flyweight boxers
Super-flyweight boxers
World light-flyweight boxing champions
World Boxing Council champions
Muay Thai trainers
Boxing trainers
Karate coaches